American Queen is said to be the largest river steamboat ever built. The ship was built in 1995 and is a six-deck recreation of a classic Mississippi riverboat, built by McDermott Shipyard for the Delta Queen Steamboat Company. Although the American Queen's stern paddlewheel is indeed powered by a steam plant, her secondary propulsion, in case of an emergency and for maneuverability around tight areas where the paddle wheel can not navigate, comes from a set of diesel-electric propellers known as Z-drives on either side of the sternwheel. She has 222 state rooms for a capacity of 436 guests and a crew of 160.

The Str. American Queen was retired to the reserve fleet in Violet, Louisiana, on 20 November 2008.  Due to the failure of Majestic America Line (her owner) she was returned to the United States Maritime Administration (MARAD) who held her $30 million mortgage.  The U.S. Department of Transportation Maritime Administration records the ship's movement to the Beaumont Reserve Fleet on January 22, 2009.   As of April 2011 American Queen is under contract for $15.5 million to HMS Global Maritime, based in New Albany, Indiana.  Based on the August, 2011 U.S. Department of Transportation Maritime Administration inventory, the ship was sold on August 2, 2009, and departed the Beaumont Reserve Fleet for Memphis, Tennessee.  The new operator, The American Queen Steamboat Company, announced plans to return her to Mississippi River service from a port in Memphis, Tennessee.  She rejoined her fellow sternwheeler steamboats Natchez, Chautauqua Belle, Minne-Ha-Ha, and the Belle of Louisville. She is currently in service.

In 2012 the American Queen participated for the first time in the Great Steamboat Race. She came in second place.

For a period around 2014, the American Queen Steamboat was a member of Historic Hotels of America, the official program of the National Trust for Historic Preservation.

In 2013 American Queen was fully refurbished and expansions were made to her dining areas and public venues.

Facilities
The American Queen has health and wellness facilities that include a spa with masseuse located on main deck and a gym and pool located between the fifth and sixth decks. For dining, the vessel offers formal dining in the J.M. White Dining Room located on main deck and a casual, 24-hour dining option called the Front Porch Cafe located on Deck 3. There is also the River Grill & Bar which is an outdoor bar on Deck 5 that offers drinks and cookout-style food during good weather. There are also several entertainment venues including the Grand Saloon - a stage theater modeled after Ford's Theatre. Other entertainment options include a movie theater on Deck 3, musical performances in the Engine Room Bar on Deck 2 and numerous card games and reading materials in the Gentlemen's Card Room, Ladies' Parlor, Mark Twain Gallery and Chart Room.

Themed voyages
American Queen passengers experience themed voyages with special appearances by various performers and lecturers, such as Lewis Hankins as Mark Twain. The Civil War themed voyage includes historians as guest speakers, and the Twain cruise features Cindy Lovell and other Twain scholars.

Routes

The American Queen has cruised the Mississippi River from its mouth to as far north as St. Paul, Minnesota. She has also traveled the entire length of the Ohio River, the Tennessee River as far up as Chattanooga, Tennessee, the Cumberland River as far up as Nashville, Tennessee and the Illinois River as far up as Ottawa, Illinois. In addition to these rivers, the American Queen enters the Yazoo Diversion Canal when visiting Vicksburg, Mississippi, Lake Ferguson when visiting Greenville, Mississippi and the Allegheny River when visiting Pittsburgh, Pennsylvania. The riverboat has also traversed the Gulf of Mexico in order to reach maintenance and repair facilities in Morgan City, Louisiana and Beaumont, Texas.

Media appearances
In 2007, American Queen was the subject of an episode of the Discovery Channel TV series Superships, and is available to view on digital download platforms such as iTunes and Amazon Prime Video.

In 2009, American Queen was featured in an episode of Little People, Big World in which the Roloff family took a cruise aboard the vessel.

In 2018, American Queen was featured in an episode of Cruising with Jane McDonald. The show followed British singer Jane McDonald on a cruise aboard the American Queen from New Orleans to Memphis.

See also
American Empress
American Duchess
American Countess
Delta Queen
Mississippi Queen

References

External links

1995 ships
Delta Queen Steamboat Company
River cruise ships
Paddle steamers of the United States
Passenger ships of the United States
Steamboats of the Mississippi River
Steamships of the United States